Koutou is a town of Xingtang County in western Hebei province, China, located  northwest of the county seat. , it has 41 villages under its administration.

See also
List of township-level divisions of Hebei

References

Township-level divisions of Hebei